Hogan's Alley, a publication devoted to comic art, is subtitled the magazine of the cartoon arts. It has been published on an irregular schedule since 1994 by Bull Moose Publishing in Atlanta. Covering comic strips, comic books, cartoons and animation, each hefty issue contains at least 144 pages with a square-backed spine. Originally planned as a quarterly, the frequency is closer to that of an annual, with 20 issues published in 22 years.

The editor is Tom Heintjes, who also edits three magazines for the Federal Reserve Bank. The magazine was co-founded by Heintjes and Rick Marschall, former editor of Nemo, the Classic Comics Library. The designer is David Folkman.

Publication history 
Interviewed in 2004. Heintjes gave some background on the magazine's origins:
Rick Marschall and I conceived the idea of Hogan's Alley in early 1994. We often talked about the type of coverage we wanted cartooning to have, and we would blue-sky about our ideal comics magazine. It sounded so good that–like a couple of idiots–we decided to put it out ourselves. In the course of that first issue, we brought David Folkman on board as art director, and he's been an indispensable part of things from the first issue. One thing we felt was important was to connect cartooning's present to its earliest days, so we came up with the title Hogan's Alley. In hindsight, from a marketing point of view, it probably isn't a good title. Most comics fans have no idea what the title represents–the Yellow Kid's neighborhood–so they don't know that they might be interested in the magazine. Also–we found this out later–a Hogan's Alley is a firearms training exercise, so I occasionally get letters from gun owners who felt tricked into picking up the magazine. I am not crazy about the idea of misleading a bunch of gun owners, but we're stuck with the title now. To fund the issue–the printing and postage and advertising–we emptied our piggy banks, sold some of our comics stuff and sought investments from friends who thought our idea had merit. The earliest issues all lost money, but it's become largely a break-even endeavor by now. We pay our writers, although David and I have never made a penny from the magazine.

Writers
The scope of the magazine ranges from historical articles to coverage of current comic strips. Contributing writers have included Ron Goulart, R. C. Harvey and Allan Holtz. In issue #12, Holtz examined the early evolution of Sunday comics supplements to the daily comic strip, notably The Importance of Mister Peewee, which ran in Joseph Pulitzer's New York World in 1903-04. In that same issue, R. C. Harvey offered an in-depth profile of cartoonist Dave Breger.

Interview subjects have included Gus Arriola, C. C. Beck and Will Eisner.

See also
Billy Ireland Cartoon Library & Museum
Comic Art
The Comics Journal
List of comic strip syndicates
The Menomonee Falls Gazette
The Menomonee Falls Guardian

References

External links
 
Craig Yoe interviews Tom Heintjes (November 8, 2007)
Hogan's Alley trading card

1994 establishments in Georgia (U.S. state)
Annual magazines published in the United States
Comics magazines published in the United States
Magazines about comics
Magazines established in 1994
Magazines published in Atlanta